Infidelity is a lost 1917 silent film drama directed by Ashley Miller and starring Anna Q. Nilsson, Eugene Strong and Miriam Nesbitt.

Cast
Anna Q. Nilsson as Elaine Bernard
Eugene Strong as Ford Maillard
Miriam Nesbitt as Dorothy Stafford
Warren Cook as Cliford Wayne
Fred C. Jones as Ali Delna
Elizabeth Spencer as Mrs. Maillard
Arthur Morrison as John Griswold

References

External links
 Infidelity at IMDb.com

1917 films
American silent feature films
Lost American films
American black-and-white films
Silent American drama films
1917 drama films
1917 lost films
Lost drama films
1910s American films
1910s English-language films